The Waitaki by-election 1962 was a by-election held in the  electorate in South Canterbury and North Otago during the term of the 33rd New Zealand Parliament, on 10 March 1962. The by-election was won by Alan Dick.

Background
The by-election was caused by the death of incumbent MP Thomas Hayman of the National Party on 2 January 1962.

Candidates
Labour
The Labour Party selected trade unionist Sir Basil Arthur as their candidate. In 1960 he had stood in the  electorate.

National
There were several names put forward as potential nominees for the National Party candidacy:

Norman Stanley Brown, a farmer from Totara Valley and past president of the Waimate branch of Federated Farmers
Alan Dick, a company director and chairman of the Tekapo Town Planning Commission
Donald James Hulston, a farmer from Waihao Forks
Bill Laney, a teacher and Mayor of Oamaru
William Brown Trotter, a farmer from Fairlie

Dick was chosen to contest the seat.

Social Credit
The Social Credit Party selected Alfred William Barwood as their candidate. Barwood was director of two companies (a Fairlie-based transport company and the McKenzies Lime Works). He was president of Social Credit's Fairlie branch and vicepresident of the Waitaki electoral committee. He had contested the seat Waitaki seat in 1960.

Results
The following table gives the election results:

The National Party initially retained the seat with a substantially reduced majority with a majority of only 320. With an estimated 1000 special votes still to be counted, this put the result in doubt. In the official count National raised the majority slightly to 402 votes.

Notes

References

Waitaki 1962
1962 elections in New Zealand
Politics of Canterbury, New Zealand
Politics of Otago
March 1962 events in New Zealand